Cycling on ABC is the de facto name for broadcasts of bicycle races produced by ABC Sports, the sports division of the American Broadcasting Company television network.

Overview

Race Across America
In 1982, Wide World of Sports devoted the April 17 and 23 editions to coverage of the Race Across America, which was then known as the Great American Bike Race. Jim Lampley anchored ABC's coverage of the inaugural race alongside Diana Nyad. ABC's coverage of the 1982 Great American Bicycle Race wound up garnering an Emmy for the Best Sports Documentary.

In total, ABC would cover the first five installments of the Race Across America. From 1983-1985, ABC aired the Race Across America in two one hour segments on Wide World of Sports. For their final year of covering the event (1986), ABC aired the Race Across America on Wide World of Sports as a single two-hour program.

Tour de France coverage

On July 26, 1976, Wide World or Sports provided coverage of the Tour de France for the very first time.

ABC later covered the Tour de France from 1989–2000, succeeding CBS in that capacity. ABC agreed to pay $1 million a year for the television rights to the Tour de France. ABC also carried Paris–Roubaix in this time frame under the Wide World of Sports umbrella.

In 1989, Sam Posey was brought in as part of the ABC Sports broadcast team covering the Tour de France. Many people were surprised by Posey's knowledge and genuine enthusiasm for the sport. ABC would bring him back as the lead anchor for the 1990 and 1991 races.

ABC's standard format for broadcasting the Tour de France consisted of a 12-minute report on behalf of Wide World of Sports on Saturdays and then,  hours worth of coverage the following afternoon. In total, ABC would present approximately eight same day telecasts. Four of them would be scheduled for broadcast on Wide World of Sports while the other four would be classified as special Sunday broadcasts.

ABC's coverage of the 1996 Tour de France was nominated for an Emmy for Outstanding Live Event Turnaround.

In 2001, ABC as well as their sister network, ESPN, would be supplanted by the Outdoor Life Network in broadcasting the Tour de France.

Summer Olympic coverage

At the 1984 Summer Olympics in Los Angeles, Al Michaels provided the play-by-play commentary for the  road cycling events alongside Greg LeMond and Eric Heiden. For the track events, Bill Flemming had the play-by-play duties alongside Eric Heiden.

Commentators

John Eustice 
Terry Gannon
Frank Gifford
Adrian Karsten 
Jim Lampley
Phil Liggett
Brent Musburger
Diana Nyad
Sam Posey 
Robin Roberts
Paul Sherwen
Beth Ruyak
Pierre Salinger
Al Trautwig

See also
Sports broadcasting contracts in the United States#Cycling

References

External links
ABC News - Tour de France
ABC Sports - Wide World of Sports - ESPN

ABC
ABC Sports
American Broadcasting Company original programming
Wide World of Sports (American TV series)
1982 American television series debuts
1986 American television series endings
1989 American television series debuts
1970s American television series
1980s American television series
1990s American television series
2000s American television series
Sports telecast series
American sports television series
American television series revived after cancellation